

This is a list of the National Register of Historic Places listings in Lincoln County, Oklahoma.

This is intended to be a complete list of the properties and districts on the National Register of Historic Places in Lincoln County, Oklahoma, United States. The locations of National Register properties and districts for which the latitude and longitude coordinates are included below, may be seen in a map.

Three Colonial Revival houses in Chandler were subject of the "Territorial Homes of Chandler" multiple property submission, which led to the Conklin and Johnson Houses being listed.

There are 46 properties and districts listed on the National Register in the county. Another property was once listed but has since been removed.

Current listings

|}

Former listing

|}

See also

 List of National Historic Landmarks in Oklahoma
 National Register of Historic Places listings in Oklahoma

References

 
Lincoln County
Buildings and structures in Lincoln County, Oklahoma